Magnús Magnússon is an Icelandic strongman competitor and former winner of Iceland's Strongest Man.

Strongman career
Magnus won the 2002 Iceland's Strongest Man contest, his career best win.

Magnusson also had podium finishes in Iceland's Strongest Viking in 2002 and 2005.

Magnus is the brother of another winner of Iceland's Strongest Man, Benedikt Magnússon.

References

Living people
Magnusson, Magnus
Year of birth missing (living people)